Zbarbar is a town and commune in Bouïra Province, Algeria. According to the 1998 census it has a population of 4,525.

Notable people
Mohamed Aïchaoui, journalist, militant and martyr

References

Communes of Bouïra Province